Bald Mountain (Ukrainian: Лиса гора, Lysa hora; Russian: Лысая гора, Lysaya gora) is a location in Slavic folk mythology related to witchcraft. According to legends, witches periodically gather on the "bald mountains" for their "Sabbath".

The exact origins and factual evidences of the concept are unclear. Notable "bald mountains" include the Łysa Góra in Poland,  Lysa Hora and Zamkova Hora hills in Kyiv, Ukraine.

Cultural references
Night on Bald Mountain (music composition by Modest Mussorgsky and Nikolay Rimsky-Korsakov inspired in the legend)
A Bald Mountain can be found in Mikhail Bulgakov's The Master and Margarita as the mountain where  the Iyeshua (Jesus of Nazareth) was crucified and it is the location of a sabbath it which Margarita takes part. 
 In 1970s, in Belarus, an anonymous poem A Tale of the Bald Mountain (Сказ пра Лысую гару) was widely circulated by samizdat. It ridiculed the "sabbath" by the members of the Belarusian Union of Soviet Writers, who quarreled during the allocation of dachas for them. 
 In Monday Begins on Saturday, a 1965 science fantasy novel by Soviet writers Boris and Arkady Strugatsky, the witch Naina Kyivna, the landlady of the protagonist regularly flies to Lysaya Gora for what is called "Annual Republican Convention". 
 Łysa Góra (Elder Speech: Ard Cerbin) is a location in the role-playing game The Witcher 3: Wild Hunt

See also 
Lysa Hora (disambiguation)
Walpurgis Night
Other locations for witches' sabbath in folklore
 Blockula (Blåkulla), Sweden
Brocken, Germany
Kyöpelinvuori, Finland
Šatrija, Lithuania

References

European witchcraft
Slavic mythology
Ukrainian folklore
Polish folklore
Locations in Slavic mythology
Mythological mountains